Apostolica Sedes – genitive form: Apostolicae Sedis or Apostolicæ Sedis –, meaning "Apostolic See", may refer to:

 Acta Apostolicae Sedis, the official gazette of the Holy See
 , a papal bull issued in 1408
 , an apostolic constitution issued in 1945
 Apostolicae Sedis moderationi, an apostolic constition issued in 1869
 An Apostolic see (Latin: Apostolica Sedes)
 The Holy See, also called the Apostolic See (Latin: Apostolica Sedes)

See also 

 In Suprema Petri Apostoli Sede

Latin words and phrases